Al-Abbas ibn Abd al-Muttalib  was a paternal uncle and Sahabi (companion) of Muhammad, just three years older than his nephew. A wealthy merchant, during the early years of Islam he protected Muhammad while he was in Mecca, but only became a convert after the Battle of Badr in 624 CE (2 AH). His descendants founded the Abbasid dynasty in 750.

Early years 
Abbas, born around 565 CE, was one of the younger sons of Abd al-Muttalib. His mother was Nutayla bint Janab of the Namir tribe. After his father's death, he took over the Zamzam Well and the distribution of water to the pilgrims. He became a spice-merchant in Mecca, a trade that made him wealthy.

Conversion to Islam 
During the years when the Muslim religion was gaining adherents (610–622), Abbas provided protection to his kinsman but did not adopt the faith. He acted as a spokesman at the Second Pledge of Aqaba, but he was not among those who emigrated to Medina.

Having fought on the side of the polytheists, Abbas was captured during the Battle of Badr. Muhammad allowed al-Abbas to ransom himself and his nephew.

Ibn Hisham said that Abbas had become a secret Muslim before the Battle of Badr; but a clear statement to that effect is missing from Tabari's citation of the same source. It is said by some authorities that he converted to Islam shortly after the Battle of Badr.

It is elsewhere implied that Abbas did not formally profess Islam until January 630, just before the fall of Mecca, twenty years after his wife Lubaba converted. Muhammad then named him "last of the migrants" (Muhajirun), which entitled him to the proceeds of the spoils of war. He was given the right to provide Zamzam water to pilgrims, a right which was passed down to his descendants.

Abbas immediately joined Muhammad's army, participating in the Conquest of Mecca, the Battle of Hunayn and the Siege of Ta'if. He defended Muhammad at Hunayn when other warriors deserted him. After these military exploits, Abbas brought his family to live in Medina, where Muhammad frequently visited them and even proposed marriage to his daughter.

Later Abbas fought in the expedition to Tabuk.

Family 
Abbas had at least five wives.
Lubaba bint al-Harith (Arabic: لبابة بنت الحارث), also known as Umm al-Fadl, was from the  Banu Hilal tribe. Umm al-Fadl claimed to be the second woman to convert to Islam, the same day as her close friend Khadijah, the first wife of Muhammad. Umm al-Fadl's traditions of the Prophet appear in all canonical collections of hadiths. She showed her piety by supernumerary fasting and by attacking Abu Lahab, the enemy of the Muslims, with a tent pole.
Fatima bint Junayd, from the Al-Harith clan of the Quraysh tribe.
Hajila bint Jundub ibn Rabia, from the Hilal tribe.
Musliya, a Greek concubine.
Tukana, a Jewish woman from the Qurayza tribe, whom Abbas married after 632.  It is not known whether any of the children were hers.
The known children of Abbas were:
Al-Faraa, who married Qatn ibn Al-Harith, a brother of Lubaba. Her mother is not named.
The following were all the offspring of Lubaba.
Al-Fadl.
Abd Allah.
Ubayd Allah. Ubayd Allah's daughter Lubaba married Abbas ibn Ali and had a son Ubayd Allah ibn Abbas ibn Ali.
Qutham.
Ma'bad.
Abd al-Rahman.
Umm Habib. 
Other children
Al-Harith. His mother is said to have been either Fatima or Hajila.
Awn, whose mother is not named.
Mushir, whose mother is not named.
Kathir, son of Musliya.
Amina, probably the daughter of Musliya.
Safiya, probably the daughter of Musliya.
Tammam, the youngest, son of Musliya.

Death 
Abbas died in February 653 at the age of 89. He is buried at the Jannatul Baqee cemetery in Medina, Saudi Arabia.

Legacy 

The Abbasid dynasty founded in 750 by Abu al-ʻAbbās ʻAbdallāh as-Saffāh better known as As-Saffah claimed the title of caliph (literally "successor") through their descent from Abbas's son Abdallah.

Many other families claimed direct descent from Abbas, including the Kalhoras of Sindh, the Berber Banu Abbas, and the modern-day Bawazir of Yemen and Shaigiya and Ja'Alin of Sudan.

Ancestors and family tree

See also 
Sahabah
List of Sahabah
List of notable Hijazis
Muhammad
Banu Abbas
Banu Hashim

References 

565 births
653 deaths
Family of Muhammad
Banu Hashim
7th-century merchants
6th-century Arabs
Burials at Jannat al-Baqī
Companions of the Prophet